The women's 10,000 metres walk event at the 2008 World Junior Championships in Athletics was held in Bydgoszcz, Poland, at Zawisza Stadium on 9 July.

Medalists

Results

Final
9 July

Participation
According to an unofficial count, 33 athletes from 21 countries participated in the event.

References

10,000 metres walk
Racewalking at the World Athletics U20 Championships
2008 in women's athletics